Khan Jamal-e Zamani (also Romanized as Khān Jamāl-e Zamānī and Khānjamāl-e Zamānī) is a village in Bavaleh Rural District, in the Central District of Sonqor County, Kermanshah Province, Iran. At the 2006 census, its population was 317, in 66 families.

References 

Populated places in Sonqor County